Rudi Godden (18 April 1907 – 4 January 1941) was a German singer and film actor, notable for his role in Nazi-era musical films such as Hello Janine! and Robert and Bertram. Das Gewehr Űber (Shoulder Arms) was a 1939 propaganda film.

Selected filmography
 Truxa (1937)
 Musketier Meier III (1938)
 The Stars Shine (1938)
 The Great and the Little Love (1938)
 Hello Janine! (1939)
 Shoulder Arms (1939)
 Robert and Bertram (1939)
 Polterabend (1940)
 Die lustigen Vagabunden (1940)
 The Unfaithful Eckehart (1940)

Bibliography
 O'Brien, Mary-Elizabeth. Nazi Cinema as Enchantment: The Politics of Entertainment in the Third Reich. Camden House, 2006.

External links

1907 births
1941 deaths
German male film actors
20th-century German male singers
Male actors from Berlin
20th-century German male actors